Christopher George Latore Wallace Jr. (born October 29, 1996), also known by his stage names Lil Biggie Smalls and Lil Biggie, is an American actor. He is commonly referred to as Christopher Jordan Wallace. He is the son of the late rapper The Notorious B.I.G and American singer Faith Evans.

Early life 
Wallace was born in New York City on October 29, 1996. He is the son of American singer Faith Evans and late rapper, Christopher "The Notorious B.I.G." Wallace, who was murdered in March 1997, when Wallace was just four months old. His paternal grandparents were from Jamaica, his maternal grandfather was of English and possibly Italian descent and his maternal grandmother was Helene Evans, a professional singer of Black American descent. He has a paternal half-sister and three maternal half-siblings.

Career 
Wallace's breakthrough role was in the 2009 biopic Notorious. In 2010, he starred in the comedy film Everything Must Go, but did not have another acting role until starring in the 2016 adventure film Kicks. In 2019, he played Amir in the third season of the VH1 slasher series Scream.

Wallace, alongside his previous stepfather Todd Russaw and fellow entrepreneur Willie Mac, launched a cannabis company called Think BIG in March 2019. The brand aims to challenge the public's perception of cannabis by launching brands, products, and collaborations that emphasize "curiosity, creativity, contemplation, and healing". The brand also prioritizes social justice initiatives. In April 2019, the company launched a brand of cannabis called Frank White, named after Wallace's father's alter-ego, as well as pre-rolls of cannabis in collaboration with Lowell Herb Co.

Filmography

Film

Television

References

External links 

American male film actors
1996 births
Living people
American rappers
American rappers of Jamaican descent
21st-century American rappers
The Notorious B.I.G.
American cannabis activists